Instiki is a wiki software written in Ruby on Rails, created by David Heinemeier Hansson and maintained by physicist Jacques Distler. Instiki is free software under the Ruby license.

Features 
Instiki includes a LaTeX plugin.

Notable users 
A custom fork of it used to run on the nLab mathematics wiki until 29 December 2021.

References

External links
 

Free software programmed in Ruby
Wiki software